Meguey Baker is a tabletop role-playing game designer, independent publisher and quilt historian. She and her husband Vincent Baker designed Apocalypse World, the first game in the Powered by the Apocalypse system.

Career

Game design 
Baker's most prominent work is Apocalypse World (2010). Apocalypse World is a post-apocalyptic game co-designed with her husband, Vincent Baker, published through Lumpley Games. Apocalypse World won multiple awards such as the 2010 Indie RPG Award for "Game of the Year" and the 2011 Lucca Comics & Games "Best Role-Playing Game" award. Powered by the Apocalypse, the game design framework created by the Bakers for Apocalypse World, has made a lasting impact on role-playing game design.

Baker is the founding owner of Night Sky Games. A Thousand and One Nights (2006), published through Night Sky Games, is a role-playing game based on the collection of Arabic stories The Book of One Thousand and One Nights. Baker has also designed other indie role-playing games such as Miss Schiffer's School for Young Ladies of Quality (2006), Psi*Run (2012) and Valiant Girls (2013); the latter were Night Sky Games' third and sixth publications respectively. She co-designed with her husband both Firebrands (2017), a romance TTRPG in a sci-fi setting focused on mobile frame pilots and Under Hollow Hills (2021), an RPG about fairytales and a traveling circus. Chase Carter for Polygon compared Firebrands to adventure romance television shows Bridgerton and Our Flag Means Death. 

Baker co-wrote Fair Game, with Emily Care Boss a blog-style design and roleplaying theory journal from 2005 to 2011.

Textiles and quilting 
She is a quilter and quilt historian, particularly interested in how the history of non-dominant voices gets transmitted in objects and oral tradition rather than the official written history. Baker highlighted that her first quilt block was hand sewn at four years old; she wrote, "I checked with my mom. She says I was 4 because my sister was a newborn and sewing helped me keep quiet while she was napping. I'm guessing I did about one seam per nap". Baker now collects and restores antique and vintage textiles, as well as creates new works. 

Baker is a Collections Assistant for the Hatfield Historical Museum and is part of the curatorial team for the Historical Society of Greenfield.

Personal life
Baker and her husband Vincent Baker have three children.

Baker studied American History at Hampshire College with a focus on early American textile history and material culture.

Bibliography

Role-playing games 
A Thousand and One Nights (2006)
Miss Schiffer's School for Young Ladies of Quality (2006)
 The Girl Effect
 Apocalypse World (2010)
Apocalypse World 2nd Edition (2016)
Apocalypse World: the Extended Refbook (2019)
Apocalypse World: Burned Over Hackbook (2019)
Psi-Run Revised (2012)
Valiant Girls (2013)
Firebrands (2017)
The King Is Dead (2018)
Towns Like Ours (2021)
Under Hollow Hills (2021)

Other 

 Unframed: The Art of Improvisation for Game Masters (2014)

References

External links
Meguey Baker's page on RPG Geek
Night Sky Games, Baker's independent publishing company.
Fair Game, Baker's design and theory journal co-authored by Emily Care Boss.

1971 births
American game designers
American women game designers
Indie role-playing game designers
Hampshire College alumni
Living people
People from Greenfield, Massachusetts
Place of birth missing (living people)
Role-playing game designers